Hans Zach (born 30 March 1949) is a German ice hockey player and coach. During his playing career he played for five different clubs in the Eishockey-Bundesliga, EC Bad Tölz, SC Riessersee, Berliner SC, EV Landshut and SB Rosenheim. He also represented the German national team in four Ice Hockey World Championships in 1976, 1977, 1978 and 1979 as well as at the 1980 Winter Olympics.

As coach he was in charge of the EC Ratingen, SV Bayreuth, Düsseldorfer EG, Kassel Huskies, Zürcher SC, Kölner Haie, Hannover Scorpions. His greatest success came with Düsseldorfer EG, who he won three national titles with from 1991 to 1993. From 1998 to 2004 he coached the German national ice hockey team.

After a period in retirement following his championship-winning season in 2009–10 with the Hannover Scorpions Zach returned to coaching on 1 January 2014 when he took over as coach of Adler Mannheim, signing a contract until the end of the 2013–14 season.

He is a member of the German Ice Hockey Hall of Fame.

Honours
 Eishockey-Bundesliga
 Champions: (5) 1975–76, 1981–82, 1990–91, 1991–92, 1992–93
 Deutsche Eishockey Liga
 Champions: (1) 2009–10
 Ice Hockey World Championships
 Participant: (4) 1976, 1977, 1978, 1979
 Olympic ice hockey tournament
 Participant: (1) 1980

References

External links

1949 births
Living people
Berliner SC players
EC Bad Tölz players
EV Landshut players
German ice hockey coaches
German ice hockey centres
Germany men's national ice hockey team coaches
Ice hockey players at the 1980 Winter Olympics
Olympic ice hockey players of West Germany
People from Bad Tölz
Sportspeople from Upper Bavaria
SC Riessersee players
Starbulls Rosenheim players